Semyono-Makarensky is a rural locality (a khutor) in Dzherokayskoye Rural Settlement of Shovgenovsky District, the Republic of Adygea, Russia. The population was 87 as of 2018. There are 4 streets.

Geography 
Semyono-Makarensky is located 21 km south of Khakurinokhabl (the district's administrative centre) by road. Volno-Vesyoly is the nearest rural locality.

References 

Rural localities in Shovgenovsky District